The Mandraka Falls are a small set of waterfalls on the Mandraka River, approximately  from Antananarivo, the capital of Madagascar.

The falls are used as a source of hydroelectric power for the Mandraka Dam, and the power station there has been supplied by the Mantasoa Dam since 1956.

References

External links

Waterfalls of Madagascar